Girls' Night Out is a South Korean erotic drama film, released in 1998 and directed by Im Sang-soo.  It centers around three women, whose overt sexual dialogue caused a stir when the film was released.

This film is not yet available with English subtitles.

Plot
Three main heroines are best friends each working in hotel, designing company and graduate student. They boldly talk each other about sex but their characters are definitely different. From this, alteration on their lives come to begin with different-type sexual relationships.

Cast
 Jin Hee-kyung as Yeon
 Kang Soo-yeon as Ho-jung
 Shin Cheol-jin as Real estate mister	
 Kim Yeo-jin as Soon

References

External links
 
 

1998 films
1990s Korean-language films
Films directed by Im Sang-soo
South Korean erotic drama films
1990s erotic drama films